

Current
The following people are commentators for ESPN's NBA coverage:
 Cory Alexander (game analyst and the NBA on ESPN Radio)
 Malika Andrews (sideline reporter, 2020–present; also worked as ESPN & ABC's sideline reporter for the 2021 NBA Finals)
 Jon Barry (lead radio analyst, TV studio analyst)
 Matt Barnes (studio analyst)
 Jay Bilas (game analyst)
 Mike Breen (lead play-by-play)
 Hubie Brown (game analyst)
 Doris Burke (lead sideline reporter from 2008–2019, game analyst)
 Caron Butler (game analyst)
 Kevin Calabro (play-by-play)
 P. J. Carlesimo (analyst)
 Vince Carter (studio analyst, game analyst)
 Brian Custer (play-by-play)
 Dan Dakich (game analyst)
 Jimmy Dykes (game analyst)
 LaPhonso Ellis (game analyst)
 Len Elmore (game analyst)
 Sean Farnham (game analyst)
 Dave Flemming (play-by-play)
 Fran Fraschilla (game analyst)
 Rosalyn Gold-Onwude (Analyst for ESPN Radio and sideline reporter for ESPN)
 Mike Greenberg (studio host)
 Israel Gutierrez (sideline reporter)
 Katie George (sideline reporter)
 Rich Hollenberg (play-by-play)
 Cassidy Hubbarth (sideline reporter)
 Mark Jackson (co-lead game analyst)
 Steve Javie (rules analyst)
 Richard Jefferson (studio analyst, game analyst)
 Mark Jones (play-by-play)
 Marc Kestecher (lead radio play-by-play, alternate TV play-by-play)
 Tim Legler (studio analyst)
 Zach Lowe (contributor)
 Jackie MacMullan (contributor)
 Sean McDonough (play-by-play)
 Monica Mcnutt (sideline reporter for ESPN and ESPN Radio)
 Beth Mowins (play-by-play)
 Chiney Ogwumike (studio analyst)
 Dave Pasch (play-by-play)
 Kendrick Perkins (studio analyst)
 JJ Redick (analyst)
 Jalen Rose (studio analyst on Fridays)
 Holly Rowe (sideline reporter)
 Ryan Ruocco (play-by-play)
 Lisa Salters (Lead Sideline reporter)
 Adam Schefter (sideline reporter)
 John Schriffen (play-by-play)
 Jorge Sedano (sideline reporter, studio host)
 Ramona Shelburne (reporter, contributor)
 Dan Shulman (play-by-play)
 Stephen A. Smith (studio analyst)
 Jeff Van Gundy (co-lead game analyst)
 Dick Vitale (game analyst)
 Bill Walton (game analyst)
 Michael Wilbon (studio analyst)
 Jay Williams (studio analyst on Fridays, game analyst)
 Brian Windhorst (reporter, contributor)
 Bob Wischusen (play-by-play)
 Adrian Wojnarowski (NBA insider, studio analyst on Fridays)

Former
The following people were commentators for ESPN's NBA coverage:
 Allison Williams (sideline reporter)
 Corey Williams (game analyst)
 Adam Amin (play by play 2016-2020)
 Greg Anthony
 Michelle Beadle (studio host 2014-2019)
 Chauncey Billups (analyst 2018-2020)
 Doug Collins (basketball analyst 2014-2017)
 Ariel Helwani (sidleine reporter 2019-2021)
 Brent Musburger (2003-2005)
 Brad Nessler (2003-2004)
 Rachel Nichols (sideline reporter/host 2016-2021)
 Dan Patrick
 Paul Pierce (studio analyst 2017-2021)
 Stuart Scott (studio host/reporter 2006 and 2007 NBA Finals)
 Maria Taylor (studio host 2019-2021)
 Mike Tirico (play by play 2003-2016)
 Tom Tolbert analyst 2003-2007)
 Stan Van Gundy (analyst/studio analyst 2018-2019)
 Rick Carlisle (game analyst 2007-2008)

References

ESPN
ESPN
NBA on ESPN